The Malian ambassador in Beijing is the official representative of the Government in Bamako to the Government of the People's Republic of China.

List of representatives

References 

 
China
Mali